Dorothy Zbornak is a character from the sitcom television series The Golden Girls, portrayed by Bea Arthur. Sarcastic, introspective, compassionate, and fiercely protective of those she considers family, she is introduced as a substitute teacher, and mother. At the time, Dorothy was recently divorced from her ex-husband Stanley. She, her mother Sophia Petrillo (played by Estelle Getty), and housemate Rose Nylund (Betty White) all rent rooms in the Miami house of their friend Blanche Devereaux (Rue McClanahan). Dorothy often acted as den mother and voice of reason among the quartet, "the great leveler" according to Bea Arthur, though at times she also acted foolishly or negatively and would need her friends and family to help ground her again. Arthur also considered her the "great balloon pricker," someone who openly defied and called out hypocrisy, injustice, cruelty, delusion, short-sighted remarks, and behavior she simply found dull, ill-considered, rude, or unreasonable.

Bea Arthur portrayed Dorothy in every episode of The Golden Girls. Arthur also portrayed Dorothy's maternal grandmother Eleanor Grisanti in flashback in the episode "Mother's Day". In the same episode and others that involve flashbacks, a younger version of Dorothy was portrayed by Lynnie Green. In the season 5 episode "Clinton Avenue Memoirs" (1990), Jandi Swanson portrayed Dorothy as a child in flashback.

Bea Arthur's departure from the show in the season 7 two-part finale "One Flew Out of the Cuckoo's Nest" marked the end of the series as well. Outside of the series, Arthur also appeared as Dorothy in an episode of Empty Nest (a spin-off series), in the episode "Dumped", and in a two-episode story "Seems Like Old Times" in The Golden Palace (a sequel series to The Golden Girls). In the 1000th issue of Entertainment Weekly, Dorothy Zbornak-Hollingsworth was selected as the Grandma for "The Perfect TV Family".

Fictional character biography
Born in New York City (as was actress Bea Arthur), Dorothy is the daughter of Italian immigrants Sophia and Salvadore Petrillo. Dorothy states in one episode that she is a Leo (born in July or August). In the episode "Nothing to Fear But Fear Itself" (1987), Sophia says Dorothy was conceived in 1931, after Sophia and Salvadore's first argument as newlyweds (Bea Arthur herself was born in 1922). In the episode "Till Death Do We Volley" (1989), it is said Dorothy attended her high school prom in 1946, though it is not mentioned if this was during her senior year or if she was younger (as some high schools have junior proms, junior/senior proms, and proms that allow anyone in high school to attend). A later episode, "An Illegitimate Concern", implies her graduation date would have been 1949. Dorothy was regarded to be in her mid-50s in the first season of The Golden Girls (Bea Arthur was 63 when the show began). In the show's final season in 1992, Dorothy's age is stated as 62 (Bea Arthur was 70 at the time).

Dorothy was called "Pussycat" by her mother and "Spumoni Face" by her father. According to the episode "Mary Has A Little Lamb", Dorothy's childhood nickname among other children was "Moose". In the fourth-season episode "Foreign Exchange," Dorothy discovers there is a possibility that she is the biological daughter of Dominic and Philomena Bosco, who claim they switched babies with the Petrillos at the hospital. Dorothy later dismisses this possibility, deciding the people who raised her are her real parents. Dorothy has two younger siblings, her brother Phil and her sister Gloria, nicknamed "Kitten" (played first by Doris Belack and later by Dena Dietrich). At an early age, Phil demonstrates that he sometimes prefers to wear feminine clothing, and Dorothy accepts this, remarking later that she sometimes borrowed her brother's outfits. While Dorothy and Phil are close and maintain affection into adulthood, Dorothy and Gloria are often at odds. Dorothy believes that Gloria unfairly judges her and resents that her mother sometimes refers to the younger sister as the "good daughter," while Gloria resents Dorothy, considering her to be the favored daughter for being so responsible and intelligent. In adulthood, Dorothy becomes estranged from Gloria after the younger sister marries a wealthy man.

Throughout her childhood, Dorothy is a "bookworm" and becomes known as an "overachiever" in high school. Due to her height, sarcasm, obvious intelligence, and deep voice, she is sometimes mocked and becomes self-conscious. An early high school boyfriend is verbally and emotionally abusive to her, further harming her self-esteem. A boy who was supposed to be her date to high school prom is thought by Sophia to be dressed inappropriately for a formal event, so she sends him away and tells Dorothy he never arrived. Dorothy later accepts a date with Stan Zbornak (Herb Edelman) because she "felt she couldn't do any better". One of their dates results in Dorothy's first pregnancy. The show says this conception happened while Dorothy was drunk, which Sophia blames on Stan's actions and peer pressure. Dorothy later claims she was unconscious and wonders if Stan "slipped" her something in her drink. In another episode, Dorothy recalls Stan guilted her into sex by claiming he was drafted to the military and could die in combat in Korea. Learning Dorothy is pregnant, her father demands Stan marry her. The two drop out of high school soon before graduation and have a shotgun wedding. While "One for the Money" says the wedding occurred in May 1944, that doesn't align with Dorothy's age in season 1 (about 55) and other episodes indicating she was still in high school in 1945 and 1946. A later episode, "An Illegitimate Concern", sets their wedding date on June 1 of 1949. This child was their daughter Kate (originally played by Lisa Jane Persky and later by Deena Freeman, each of whom was several years younger than Kate would have been). Years later, they had a son Michael (Scott Jacoby) whom Dorothy would occasionally clash with due to the boy's habit of avoiding responsibility and reluctance to plan ahead.

Stan and Dorothy buy property in Miami during their honeymoon there and later make the city their home. Dorothy completes her high school education and attends college, majoring in American history. Her college roommate is Jean (former Miss America semifinalist Lois Nettleton) and the two become close friends. When Jean realizes years afterward that she is a lesbian, Dorothy accepts her (and later discovers Sophia always knew). During this time, Dorothy also teaches part-time at a school for the blind. She learns French and becomes a high school teacher, and later a substitute teacher, teaching mainly English and American History. Dorothy is a very dedicated and strong-willed teacher, earning the nickname "Attila The Sub" from some students. During this time, she becomes godmother to a friend's daughter, Jenny.

The Zbornak marriage involves many arguments and compromises, including years of struggle when Stan's business fails, but Dorothy later claims there were also many happy times together. After 38 years, Stan has an affair with a flight attendant named Chrissy and goes to Maui with her, having an attorney send Dorothy divorce papers rather than approaching her about it in person. Now divorced, Dorothy (keeping the surname of Zbornak) moves out of her house to rent a room in order to save more income. She meets Rose Nylund, a widow from the town of St. Olaf, and the two rent rooms in a house owned by widow Blanche Devereaux, from a wealthy family in Atlanta. By this time, Dorothy's father is dead and her mother Sophia is a resident at a retirement community called Shady Pines after suffering a stroke. In the pilot episode of the series, Shady Pines burns down and Sophia moves into Blanche's remaining room so Dorothy can look after her, completing the quartet of The Golden Girls. Sophia resents that her daughter is now her caretaker and Dorothy likewise gets annoyed by Sophia's stubborn nature and biting remarks at times. After Shady Pines is rebuilt, Dorothy regularly threatens to send her mother back whenever Sophia's biting humor or reckless behavior tries her patience. In truth, she is fiercely protective of her mother, doing everything she can to protect and support the woman, often checking that Sophia is breathing when she is asleep or napping, making sure her mother regularly sees a doctor, and openly sharing her doubts and fears with the elder Petrillo.

Throughout the series, Dorothy navigates money concerns, returning to substitute teaching in order to provide for herself and Sophia, and romantic drama, searching for a new partner but often finding she is not ready or the match is not right. Dorothy also takes on other odd jobs on occasion. She teaches a night-school course for adults wishing to complete their high school equivalency, including Rose. She briefly takes a job teaching business executives but decides not to continue when they make it clear that they have no interest in learning new things. During summers, she works as a tutor for local children and for a time works alongside Blanche at the local museum. She briefly becomes a writer for the educational children's program The Mister Terrific Show and appears on the show as "Mrs. School Teacher" before quitting. At times, she pursues acting in local theatre and commercial work and briefly attempts stand-up comedy. For a brief time, Rose and Dorothy attempt to coach a children's football team. Dorothy also acts as a local event coordinator on a few occasions. When her ex-husband's uncle dies, she and Stan inherit his apartment building and she becomes a landlady.

Family and old friends often bring drama into Dorothy's life. She deals with problematic relatives on multiple occasions, as well as her role as a mother. She gets to see both her children married, Kate to a podiatrist named Dennis, and Michael to a singer in his band named Lorraine. Dennis later cheats on Kate, but she forgives him, and they remain together. Dorothy is concerned about Michael's marriage since it is partially spurred by the fact that Lorraine is pregnant and is 44 years old while he is in his 20s (though a later episode sets his age at several years older). However, she comes to accept the relationship and is happy to know she has a grandchild on the way. At times, Dorothy only realizes certain relationships and friendships are toxic when Blanche, Rose, and/or Sophia point it out to her (despite her occasional objections). Later in the series, Dorothy experiences the death of her brother, Phil, from heart problems.

Dorothy's ex-husband, Stan, periodically returns to her life, sometimes for the sake of a business venture, other times to reunite romantically after his relationship with Chrissy fails. At one point, Dorothy and Stan date again for months and decide to remarry, but Dorothy changes her mind when Stan insists on a prenuptial agreement minutes before the ceremony is to begin, stating that he needs the protection. The two later attend therapy together so they can have a healthier relationship and to help Stan accept that they are not reuniting. Later, Dorothy's sister Gloria, now a widow and broke after losing her money to junk bonds, comes to Miami to spend time with Sophia and ends up asking Dorothy how to live happily again from depression and loneliness. Dorothy offers perspective, and the two start to reconcile, but Gloria then sleeps with Stan in Dorothy’s bed. Gloria apologizes but then does so again the same day. Learning Sophia encouraged the two of them to get together because she figured that Gloria needs someone to take care of her, Dorothy is angry at all three of them but later reconciles with each. Gloria realizes that she hates Stan's behavior and decides not to pursue anything further with him.

At the end of the series, after living in Blanche's house for seven years, Dorothy meets and falls in love with Lucas Hollingsworth (Leslie Nielsen), Blanche's uncle (her father's baby brother). The two marry, and Dorothy moves into Lucas' home in Hollingsworth Manor in Atlanta. Sophia decides to remain with Blanche and Rose in Miami, believing she has a life there now and that Dorothy needs to explore her new relationship without her. In the sequel series The Golden Palace, the three operate a hotel together. In a two-part story, the new Mrs. Dorothy Hollingsworth visits to briefly reunite with her Miami family and examine the business.

Social commentary and politics 
The Golden Girls dealt with social issues that were considered topical and possibly controversial in the 1980s. Different episodes depict Dorothy dealing with phobias regarding hospitals and heights, first denying her fears and vulnerabilities before openly admitting them and seeking coping mechanisms. Dorothy also reveals she is a former smoker and recovering gambling addict. After briefly engaging in gambling again, she immediately falls into old habits, avoiding social situations but dismissing professional work in order to gamble more. Realizing her problem has resurfaced, she seeks help from Gamblers Anonymous and begins her recovery process anew. When Dorothy sees Blanche in a toxic relationship, the latter defends herself by saying her new boyfriend never physically assaults or hits her. Dorothy then relates her experience with verbal and emotional abuse, arguing that abuse does not need to be physical to cause harm.

During the run of the show, Dorothy repeatedly expresses liberal views but never declares her party affiliation, though she does have a Michael Dukakis bumper sticker (covering a Walter Mondale bumper sticker) on her car. When then-President George H. W. Bush visits Miami, Dorothy intends to angrily confront him regarding education, only to be rendered mute at the shock of actually meeting him. Dorothy shared many of Bea Arthur's political views, who in a 2005 interview remarked "that's what makes Maude and Dorothy so believable: we have the same viewpoints on how our country should be handled."

Dorothy's strong moral principles brought her into conflict with different people throughout the series, including the school in which she worked. When she refuses to give a lazy student passing grades simply because he is a star athlete, meaning he cannot play football, the school threatens and intimidates her. When the student later plays football anyway and breaks his leg, Dorothy visits him in the hospital, determined to continue teaching him. She reads him A Tale of Two Cities. On some occasions, Dorothy's beliefs and moral judgments are challenged, forcing her to reassess. When her son Mike decides to marry a woman 21 years older than him, Dorothy is concerned about the age difference but later concedes is not her business to stop them from marrying. In "Dorothy's Prized Pupil", Dorothy expresses compassion for such as Mario (Mario Lopez), a student who is an undocumented immigrant, offering to help him. When Blanche and Rose warn her that her new friend Barbara Thorndyke seems toxic, narrow-minded and snobbish, Dorothy repeatedly defends the woman, despite her obvious condescending attitudes. However, Dorothy later realizes that her friends are right when Barbara reveals that Sophia's Jewish friend will not be accepted to a "restricted" (i.e. WASP-only or predominantly so) club, whose membership policy Barbara tolerates merely because "they serve a great breakfast and the parking is free".

Multiple episodes of The Golden Girls dealt with LGBT issues and with Dorothy's inclusive attitudes (Bea Arthur herself was openly supportive of the LGBT community). In the second season, Dorothy demonstrates a strong friendship with her friend Jean, who she knows is a lesbian. She consoles Jean following the death of the woman's romantic partner Pat and offers her sympathy when Jean later realizes she is developing romantic feelings for a heterosexual woman. In the same story, Dorothy, Sophia, Rose, and Blanche openly discuss homosexuality and accept it, even though some of them don't fully understand it. Likewise, Dorothy openly discusses her brother Phil Petrillo's cross-dressing without ever shaming him or feeling embarrassed that he does so. In the season 3 episode "Strange Bedfellows", the women are present when Gil Kessler, a man running for local office, reveals he is a trans man and had gender reassignment surgery in 1968. Rose is confused about what such surgery involves but continues to identify Kessler as male. Dorothy is upset, not due to Kessler's revelation but because he decides to drop out of the political race following his revelation (and because she is in a fight with Blanche). Other episodes deal with Blanche coming to terms with her brother being gay and later wishing to marry his partner.

When her mother Sophia makes a new friend Alvin, only for him to not recognize her one day due to a mental condition (possibly Alzheimer's), Dorothy comforts her mother and they openly discuss fears regarding aging and mental health. One episode involves Sophia being asked by a friend to assist in her suicide, leading her and Dorothy to discuss the matter and whether such action is acceptable.

A two-episode story "Sick and Tired" in season 5 has Dorothy suffering from extreme exhaustion and recurring illness but finding no cause from medical scans, leading one doctor to suggest it is depression and psychosomatic, while another tells her she's simply older now and must expect such problems. Dorothy persists and finally finds a doctor who diagnoses her with chronic fatigue syndrome. Susan Harris, the show's co-creator, also suffered from the then largely unrecognized condition. The story ends with Dorothy confronting one of the doctors who dismissed her, finding that the man does not recognize her. She remarks on the danger and insensitivity of doctors who do not listen to their patients and muses that she may have been taken more seriously had she been a man.

Character casting and development 
Dorothy Zbornak's last name was taken from Kent Zbornak, a friend and colleague of show co-creator and scriptwriter Susan Harris. Kent Zbornak wound up becoming the stage manager on The Golden Girls. From the start, Harris envisioned Dorothy as a sarcastic, authoritarian teacher who would constantly clash with her quick-witted mother. In an interview for the 2003 TV special The Golden Girls: Their Greatest Moments, Bea Arthur said, "Dorothy Zbornak was probably the only sane person on the show. I loved her, she had great humor... She was the steady one. She was the great leveler. She was the great balloon pricker, if you will." The producers were by their own admission "picky" about the casting for all the principal parts, deciding to take extra time if needed to find the right actors for each role so the cast would feel balanced and complementary. For Dorothy Zbornak, the show specified they wanted "a Bea Arthur type". Arthur herself was not asked due to an assumption she would not consider returning to a regular television series after spending years as the strongly opinionated lead character of Maude. Maude had been a recurring character on All in the Family and her popularity in the role led to her spin-off series, which in turn had its own spin-off Good Times.

In her show Elaine Stritch at Liberty, Elaine Stritch claimed to have been considered for the role at one point but that she "blew her audition" by improvising colorful language and so was not cast as Dorothy. Stritch fit the "Bea Arthur type" description and had actually played a version of Arthur's character Maude in Nobody's Perfect, a British adaptation of Maude broadcast in 1980 by ITV. The show ran for two years with a total of 14 episodes. Of the 14 episodes, Stritch herself adapted 13 original Maude scripts and co-star Richard Griffiths adapted one.

Following Stritch's auditions, others read for the role. Then, according to Bea Arthur herself, "This is so funny. My agent called me and said, 'What is this? I hear you're doing a new series... Something called Golden Girls.'" Bea Arthur and her agent investigated and discovered that several women had auditioned for a role described as "a Bea Arthur type" and it had led to a rumor that she was herself involved. At the time Arthur had taken a position as the spokeswoman for Shoppers Drug Mart, a Canadian drugstore chain (a role she would continue concurrently with her role as Dorothy). Arthur then requested to see the script.

According to Arthur in an interview for The Times, "When I was first sent the script for the pilot [of The Golden Girls], I fell in love with it — it was so bright, so witty, so adult. But it never really dawned on me it was about these older women. Apparently, it was presented to a number of producers and they turned it down — ‘Who cares about older women?’ I guess it was revolutionary because it was the first time older women were shown in an atmosphere where they were well-groomed, well dressed, had active sex lives. Prior to that, when old people were shown on television, you could almost smell them." Despite this, Arthur hesitated to join the cast after learning that the other two leads - the sexually forward Blanche and the sheltered and sometimes naive Rose - were to be played by Rue McClanahan, who had co-starred with her as Vivian Harmon on Maude, and Betty White, known for playing flirtatious, sexually liberated Sue Ann Nivens on The Mary Tyler Moore Show, Arthur believed the show was typecasting both of them, assuming that McClanahan was portraying Rose and White would portray Blanche. The producers asked McClanahan to reach out to Arthur. When she did, Arthur said, "Rue, I'm not interested in playing Maude and Vivian Meet Sue Ann Nivens." McClanahan explained that while that had been the original idea the plan had changed; she would portray "the vamp" Blanche and White would be playing Rose. Impressed that the producers were subverting expectation rather than type-casting, and after further discussion with McClanahan, Arthur agreed to portray Dorothy Zbornak.

Bea Arthur said that she was fortunate in being allowed to shape her characters in both Maude and The Golden Girls along with the writers. On July 7, 1995, on an episode of the British daytime talk show This Morning, she explained, "In both sitcoms that I did do, we were given... the opportunity of saying, 'No, I don't think I'd say that'... It was really give-and-take between the writers and actors... I was blessed that we had wonderful people."

Arthur and the writers worked together to evolve Dorothy's character. Along with her sarcasm and righteous anger, Dorothy was also portrayed as a humble woman who was sometimes insecure about her appearance and whether people wanted to include her or thought of her as fun and interesting. Her divorce, along with previous negative and abusive relationships, sometimes made her insecure about new relationships. The show established that she had phobias of hospitals and heights, but that she worked to overcome these. She also showed addictive habits in regards to smoking and gambling, quitting both. While a fairly liberal woman, on occasion she would reveal conservative views or a fear of new situations and social situations she didn't have experience with before. Due to Bea Arthur's experience as a singer in theatre, Dorothy occasionally showed off singing talent. While Dorothy could be moralistically judgmental, she also had compassion for people who were earnest in regretting mistakes and harm they had caused.

Along with being a lead on The Golden Girls, Arthur portrayed Dorothy in the spin-off series Empty Nest in an episode entitled "Dumped". The series Empty Nest featured a physician (a friend of Dorothy's) and his two daughters, all of whom lived in a house next door to the cast of The Golden Girls.

Working with Estelle Getty 
Estelle Getty was cast as Dorothy's mother Sophia Petrillo. Despite being over a year younger than Bea Arthur, Estelle was known for being able to play older roles and was further aged for the camera thanks to make-up and a wig. Regarding working with Arthur, Estelle Getty said, "Bea cracks me up the same way that I crack her up. She's one of the brilliant comic minds of our day, she's just that good... I love Bea Arthur like she was my own daughter... I think of Bea very often in a very maternal way."

Arthur told David Levin, "The characters of Dorothy and her mother, played by me and Estelle, I think was one of the great comedic duos that has ever been done. I think it ranks up there with Laurel and Hardy... The absurdity of the love/hate relationship... The difference in size... It was brilliant... The writers were so brilliant... It was a joy coming to work every day... Everyone connected with Golden Girls was not a genius but damn close to it. Including our costume designer... I remember one of my very favorite episodes was when Sophia had entered the two of us in a mother/daughter beauty contest at Shady Pines and for the talent section we did Sonny and Cher's 'I Got You Babe.' And I remember Judy Evans, this brilliant costumer, had little Estelle in it was kind of a furry jacket with a mustache and I had black hair down to my behind... It was fabulous... Every day was so meaningful." In response to their performances as Sophia and Dorothy, both Getty and Arthur won Emmy Awards for Outstanding Lead and Support Actress in a Comedy Series. Along with All in the Family, Will & Grace, and Schitt's Creek, Golden Girls is the only other show in American television where each of the lead actors has won an Emmy.

Arthur remarked that she found it natural to learn younger viewers were drawn to Golden Girls, particularly due to Dorothy's defiance of her mother and Sophia's defiance of Dorothy and often society. "It was all so anti-establishment, you know, that even kids loved it... They loved the character of the mother who said the most outrageous things."

Departure 
Bea Arthur's contract came up for review after the sixth season and she decided that the next and seventh season would be her last on the show. She said that while she was grateful for the experience she wanted to return to live theatre and thought it was best to leave before popularity waned or Dorothy became too predictable to audiences. "I thought,  we've hit it, we've really done it. And why hang on... just to keep it running and to go over the same stuff again? It's never going to be as rewarding." Rue McClanahan believed that Arthur felt she didn't have much to do to further Dorothy's development and so felt the role had become stagnant. "I think she just wanted more to do." It was decided that Dorothy's departure in the season finale would be marked by giving her a happy ending with a marriage to "a nice guy" in contrast with the many failed romances audiences had seen her in and with the fact that the show had begun with her recently divorced from a cheating husband. Leslie Nielsen portrayed her new love interest Lucas and played practical jokes on the set, providing comic relief to counter the high emotions surrounding Arthur's departure. Arthur admitted that even though she wanted to leave, and was happy that Dorothy would be marrying the "gorgeous" Leslie Nielsen, she was very sad to do so in the end and say goodbye to the cast and crew.

As season 7 began, NBC moved The Golden Girls to a new night and ratings suffered, with the show's ranking going from No. 10 to No. 35 that year, the first time the series has ever been outside of the "top ten". This, along with Bea Arthur's departure, led NBC to reconsider if the series could continue without Dorothy. The other three cast members were willing to continue and so a spin-off sequel series was created for them for CBS, The Golden Palace. In the series, Blanche, Rose and Sophia operate a hotel together after Dorothy has married and left Florida. In the show's first season, Arthur made a guest appearance as Dorothy in a two-episode story "Seems Like Old Times". The series ended soon afterward and was not picked up for a second season. Betty White said that Bea Arthur's departure was deeply felt in the spin-off. "It became Golden Girls in the Lobby without Bea. And it just doesn't work, it's like taking a leg off a table. Table doesn't balance if you take a leg off of it, you know."

In her 1995 interview with This Morning, Arthur was asked about her departure from The Golden Girls and her return to live theatre. "I started doing sitcom television in 1972. July 5th to be exact... Maude... I spent most of my adult life in that little box [television] and I really felt it was time to get back to one's roots... Not that it wasn't terribly rewarding." When asked about her character Dorothy apparently being the "linchpin" of the show and that her absence may have been why the sequel series The Golden Palace didn't gel for audiences, she conceded this was apparently the observation of some but that she didn't know herself why the series wasn't successful.

References

External links
Dorothy's biography on Lifetime TV's website.
Lifetime TV's site for The Golden Girls

The Golden Girls characters
Fictional schoolteachers
Fictional characters from New York City
Fictional gamblers
Fictional Italian American people
Television characters introduced in 1985
American female characters in television
American sitcom television characters

de:Golden Girls#Dorothy Zbornak